Hooj Choons is a house record label formed by Alex Simons and Red Jerry (real name Jeremy Dickens) in 1990. The first release was "Carnival de Casa" by Rio Rhythm Band, however, it was not until 1992's release of Felix's "Don't You Want Me", which Red Jerry and Faithless founder-member Rollo co-produced, that Hooj Choons had their first crossover hit. Over the next ten years, Hooj Choons had several notable releases including productions from artists such as Diss-Cuss, Tilt, Oliver Lieb and JX. The label built up a roster of popular club hits and smaller underground classics over 20 years.

Dissolution
In 2003, Hooj announced its dissolution as a record label.  Hooj Choons was dissolved having released 136 singles plus a dozen or so album-length compilations.  It is survived by its sub-label Lost Language, which has subsequently released the album Oid by Space Manoeuvres.

In early October 2006, Hooj Choons announced that the label would be coming back under management from the owners of Lost Language. Their first release upon return was a re-release of Medway's "Resurrection" with new material slated for autumn 2007.  After another few years on hiatus, they released The Wasp EP by Dopefish in January 2011.

Discography

Compilation albums
Some of These Were Hooj... (1993)
Some of These Were Hooj... Two (1995)
Some of These Were Hooj... Three (1996)
Deeper Shades of Hooj (1997)
Deeper Shades of Hooj Vol. 2 (1998)
Deeper Shades of Hooj Vol. 3 (2000)
Nu Progressive Era (2001)
Form+Function (2001)
Le Future Le Funk (2003)
Some of These Were Hooj Vol.4 (2009)

See also
 Lists of record labels
 List of electronic music record labels

References

External links
 Official website
 
 Reviews of Hooj Singles from Progressive-Sounds
 Reviews of Hooj Choons Releases from Tranceforum [German]
 Label page on Resident Advisor

British record labels
House music record labels
Trance record labels
Record labels established in 1990
English electronic dance music record labels